Steffen Nystrøm (born 1 July 1984 in Kirkenes) is a Norwegian football striker.

He played for Norild IL, Moss FK, Strømsgodset and Tromsø before joining Fredrikstad.

Being part Sápmi, Nystrøm was joint top goalscorer, beside Eirik Lamøy and Tom Høgli, of the 2006 VIVA World Cup with six goals.

In 2017 he settled in Borgen, Ullensaker and joined the fifth-tier club Kløfta IL. From 2018 he was also Kløfta IL's managing director.

Career statistics

References

1984 births
Living people
People from Sør-Varanger
Norwegian footballers
Norwegian Sámi sportspeople
Moss FK players
Strømsgodset Toppfotball players
Tromsø IL players
Fredrikstad FK players
Norwegian First Division players
Eliteserien players
Norwegian Sámi people
Association football forwards
Association football midfielders
Sportspeople from Troms og Finnmark